Nicholas Kalmakoff (1873–1955), was a Russian symbolic artist whose work is characterised by motifs dealing with spirituality, occultism and sexuality. He led the life of a hermit and died in obscurity. Seven years after his death, in 1962, Bertrand Collin du Bocage and Georges Martin du Nord discovered samples of his abandoned work in a large flea market to the north of Paris. Kalmakoff's works were finally exhibited at Galerie Motte Paris in February 1964.

References 

20th-century Russian artists
1873 births
1955 deaths